Tipulogaster is a genus of robber flies (insects in the family Asilidae). There are at least two described species in Tipulogaster.

Species
These two species belong to the genus Tipulogaster:
 Tipulogaster glabrata (Wiedemann, 1828) i c g b
 Tipulogaster lancea Tomasovic, 2002 c g
Data sources: i = ITIS, c = Catalogue of Life, g = GBIF, b = Bugguide.net

References

Further reading

 
 
 

Asilidae genera
Articles created by Qbugbot